College Football on TBS was the American presentation of the TBS cable channel's regular season college football television package.

History

Initial coverage
TBS became the first cable station to nationally broadcast college football live when it began airing games during the 1982 season. The games were aired under a special "supplemental" television contract with the NCAA. ESPN followed later the same year, starting with a simulcast of the Independence Bowl match-up between Kansas State and the University of Wisconsin on December 11, 1982, which was the first college football game shown live on ESPN.

When TBS (or WTBS as it was officially known at the time) first broadcast college football in 1982, they aired a package of live  Division I-AA games on Thursday night and Division I-A games on Saturday. games. WTBS was only able to show teams that had not been on national television in 1981. There were a maximum of four teams that had been on regional television on two occasions. Meanwhile, ABC and CBS had the right to take away a game from WTBS as long as it did so no later than the Monday before the game. Bob Neal and Tim Foley were the booth commentators for WTBS during this period. Meanwhile, Craig Sager, Paul Hornung and Pepper Rodgers anchored the pregame show for WTBS.

By 1984, WTBS started (primarily) carrying SEC games. On June 8 of that year, the Supreme Court handed down a decision that allowed individual schools to control their own TV rights. That began the conference syndication packages in earnest and to the glut of games that continues to this day. TBS' coverage from this era was essentially the forerunner to the ESPN's Thursday/Saturday night packages.

2002–2006 coverage
TBS dropped college football after the 1992 season and left the field for several years. However, it again broadcast college football games from 2002–2006, showing Big 12 and Pac-10 matchups. These were broadcast on the network as part of a sublicensing agreement with Fox Sports Net, who is the national cable partner for both conferences. TBS' coverage was originally known as Big PlayStation Saturday, but this was dropped before the final season. The network aired two games a week for the first four seasons of the contract but dropped to one for some weeks during the final season.

Theme music
Nickelback's (featuring Kid Rock and Dimebag Darrell) 2003 cover of Elton John's "Saturday Night's Alright for Fighting" was used as the theme song for TBS' Saturday Night College Football telecasts. In the show's open, the song is accompanied by a drumline and cymbalists, while clips of the two teams playing the night's featured game are interspersed throughout.

TBS would also use the NFL on TNT theme c. 1997 (dubbed "Warrior Dance" and composed by Edd Kalehoff) for their Carquest/MicronPC.com Bowl and Senior Bowl coverage and their Saturday Night College Football coverage from 2002–2003.

Games on TBS (Division I-A games only)

Excludes the schedules from the 2002 and 2003 seasons because they could not be found.

1980s

1982 

November 25 Virginia @ Virginia Tech  Additional Thursday game West Virginia vs. Rutgers (at Giants Stadium)

1983 

There was no football telecast on September 24 as Notre Dame was playing against Miami in prime time on CBS. There also was no football telecast on November 26 as TBS instead, aired a Louisville-Kentucky basketball game with Skip Caray and Joe Dean on the call.

December 3 Air Force @ San Diego State
Additional Games:
Hawaii @ New Mexico
West Virginia @ Maryland

1984 (SEC Full Package begins)

1985 

Other games in 1985
August 31 Noon ET Florida State @ Tulane, 7:30 ET Washington State @ Oregon

        
September 28 7:30 ET Boston College @ Army

Oklahoma State @ Washington

September 21 7:30 ET Oklahoma @ Minnesota

1986 

Other Games
Illinois @ Nebraska
Michigan State @ Arizona State
Ohio State @ Purdue
Notre Dame @ Navy (in Baltimore)
Iowa @ Minnesota

1987

1988

1989

1990s

1990

1991

2000s

2004

2005

2006

Commentators

Play-by-play
 Gary Bender
 Chip Caray
 Skip Caray
 Kevin Harlan
 Verne Lundquist
 Bob Neal
 Lindsey Nelson
 Ron Thulin
 Pete van Wieren – After joining TBS Sports in 1975, he covered the Atlanta Flames of the National Hockey League, Big Ten Conference college football games on TBS, the Atlanta Hawks and Atlanta Falcons NFL pre-season football.

Color commentators
 Trev Alberts
 Charles Davis
 Archie Griffin
 Pat Haden
 Paul Hornung
 Tim Foley
 Mark May
 Alan Page
 Tom Ransey
 Dave Rowe
 Sam Wyche

Sideline reporters
 Erin Andrews – She worked as a studio host for Turner Sports from 2002–04, covering the Atlanta Braves and college football for TBS and Atlanta Thrashers and Atlanta Hawks for Turner South.
 Marc Fein
 Craig Sager – Sager reported from the sideline for TBS' Pac-10/Big 12 college football coverage from 2002 to 2006. He also served as the sideline reporter for the 50th annual Delchamps Senior Bowl from Ladd Memorial Stadium in Mobile, Alabama, and the 1998 and 2000 Micron PC Bowl, formerly known as the Carquest Bowl.

Studio hosts
 Kevin Christopher
 Marc Fein
 Ernie Johnson, Jr.
 Craig Sager

Studio analysts
 Brian Bosworth
 Paul Hornung
 Pepper Rodgers

See also
 List of Champs Sports Bowl broadcasters (1995 (December)–2000)
 List of Gator Bowl broadcasters (1993–1994)
 List of Insight Bowl broadcasters (1989–1991)
 List of Outback Bowl broadcasters (1983–1986)

References

External links
 

TBS (American TV channel) original programming
TBS
1990s American television series
1982 American television series debuts
2006 American television series endings
Turner Sports
TBS
TBS